Events from the year 1679 in Denmark.

Incumbents 

 Monarch – Christian V
 Grand Chancellor – Frederik Ahlefeldt

Events 
 2 September – The Treaty of Fontainebleau ends hostilities between Denmark-Norway and the Swedish Empire in the Scanian War. Denmark, pressured by France, restores all conquests made during the war to Sweden in turn for a "paltry indemnity". 
 26 September – The Peace of Lund end the Scanian War.

Births

Full date unknown 
 Jacob Fosie, painter (died 1763)

Deaths 
 29 June – Christopher Heerfordt, pharmacist and botanist (born 1609)
 16 September – Søren Nielsen May, priest (born (year of birth unknown)

Full date unknown 
 Christoffer Godskesen Lindenov, naval officer and landowner (born 1612)

References 

 
Denmark
Years of the 17th century in Denmark